Nauru was part of the British Western Pacific Territories from September 1914 and June 1921. The British Government had ceased to exercise any direct role in the governance of Nauru by 1968, when the island achieved its independence.

The Nauruan government maintains an Honorary Consul, Martin W I Weston. The British High Commission in Suva is responsible for the United Kingdom's bilateral relations with Nauru.

Nauru is part of the Commonwealth of Nations, but King Charles III is not Nauru's head of state.

References

 
United Kingdom
Bilateral relations of the United Kingdom
Foreign relations of Nauru
Foreign relations of the United Kingdom
Nauru and the Commonwealth of Nations
Relations of colonizer and former colony
United Kingdom and the Commonwealth of Nations